Potlatch State Park is a  Washington state park located on Hood Canal near the town of Potlatch in Mason County. The park offers camping, hiking, boating, fishing, shellfish harvesting, beachcombing, and sailboarding.

References

External links
Potlatch State Park Washington State Parks and Recreation Commission 
Potlatch State Park Map Washington State Parks and Recreation Commission

Parks in Mason County, Washington
State parks of Washington (state)